James Dunlop (March 28, 1793 – May 6, 1872) was a United States Circuit Judge and later Chief United States Circuit Judge of the United States Circuit Court of the District of Columbia.

Education and career

Dunlop was born in Georgetown, which at that time was in that portion of the State of Maryland ceded to the federal government pursuant to the Residence Act of 1790 but which remained under the jurisdiction of Maryland until the enactment of the District of Columbia Organic Act of 1801. He received an Artium Baccalaureus degree in 1811 from the College of New Jersey (now Princeton University) and read law. He was Secretary of the Corporation of Georgetown, D.C. until 1838. He was a Judge of the Criminal Court of the District of Columbia from 1838 to 1845.

Federal judicial service

Dunlop received a recess appointment from President James K. Polk on October 3, 1845, to a Judge seat on the United States Circuit Court of the District of Columbia vacated by Judge Buckner Thruston. He was nominated to the same position by President Polk on December 23, 1845. He was confirmed by the United States Senate on February 3, 1846, and received his commission the same day. His service terminated on November 27, 1855, due to his elevation to be Chief Judge of the same court.

Dunlop received a recess appointment from President Franklin Pierce on November 27, 1855, to the Chief Judge seat on the United States Circuit Court of the District of Columbia vacated by Chief Judge William Cranch. He was nominated to the same position by President Pierce on December 3, 1855. He was confirmed by the Senate on December 7, 1855, and received his commission the same day. The court was superseded by the Supreme Court of the District of Columbia (now the United States District Court for the District of Columbia).

Later career and death

Following his departure from the federal bench, Dunlop resumed private practice in Georgetown, D.C. from 1863 to 1872. He died in Georgetown on May 6, 1872.

References

Sources

Further reading
 James Dunlop, O Say Can You See: Early Washington, D.C., Law & Family (accessed November 4, 2015) This person page networks the involvement of James Dunlop in the legal records and proceedings of the Circuit Court for the District of Columbia between 1800 and 1862.

1793 births
1872 deaths
19th-century American judges
19th-century American politicians
Judges of the United States Circuit Court of the District of Columbia
People from Georgetown (Washington, D.C.)
United States federal judges appointed by Franklin Pierce
United States federal judges appointed by James K. Polk
United States federal judges admitted to the practice of law by reading law